Karim Zeroual (born 14 November 1993) is a British television presenter and actor.

Early life
Zeroual was born in London to parents of Moroccan heritage and was brought up by his mother. He attended theatre school in London.

Stage and television career 
Zeroual starred as Sadiq in The Sparticle Mystery, which ran for three series between 2011 and 2015. He has also appeared on EastEnders, Blue Peter, Top Class, DaVinci's Demons, Saturday Mash-Up!, Richard Osman's House of Games, Bitesize Daily, Horrible Histories: Gory Games and Remotely Funny. He has been a Children's BBC presenter since 2014, presenting directly from the CBBC HQ. He has fronted Ten Pieces Party Live Lesson events with the BBC National Orchestra of Wales and hosted interviews at CBBC Summer Social events with a range of children’s authors. He has also presented Young Dancer and Wimbledon Live and has performed in London’s West End in musical theatre shows such as The Lion King and Chitty Chitty Bang Bang.

In 2019, he started filming a travel and sport documentary for CBBC titled A Week to Beat the World, in which he takes three British children to countries including Guatemala, Brazil and Japan to play national sports and see if they can beat the locals at their own game. A year later, it was announced that he would be starring in the ninth series of Celebs Go Dating.

In December 2020 he featured on an episode of Michael McIntyre’s The Wheel as a specialist on children’s TV.

Strictly Come Dancing
In 2019, he appeared in the seventeenth series of BBC's Strictly Come Dancing in which he was partnered with professional dancer Amy Dowden. The pair received the first perfect 40 points of the series for their Jive in Week 11 and were runners-up in the competition.

 score awarded by guest judge Alfonso Ribeiro
 number indicates Karim & Amy were at the top of the leaderboard

References

Living people
1993 births
Television personalities from London
British people of Moroccan descent